Global Warming: The Signs and The Science is a 2005 documentary film on global warming made by ETV, the PBS affiliate in South Carolina, and hosted by Alanis Morissette.  The documentary examines the science behind global warming and pulls together segments filmed in the United States, Asia and South America and shows how people in these different locales are responding in different ways to the challenges of global warming to show some of the ways that the world can respond.

See also

External links
 Global Warming: The Signs and The Science PBS 2005-11-02

Documentary films about global warming
2005 films
2005 in the environment
2005 documentary films
2005 television films
American documentary films
2000s English-language films
2000s American films